AC3Filter is a free DirectShow filter for real time audio decoding and processing. It can decode the audio formats AC3, DTS, and MPEG Multichannel.

Features
Features include:
 Playback of video with DTS and AC3 audio tracks,
 Up-mix of any audio track (up to 6 channels),
 Encoding any audio to AC3 and transmitting it over SPDIF.

References

External links 

 

Free audio codecs
Free software primarily written in assembly language
Free software programmed in C
Free software programmed in C++
Audio codecs
Windows-only free software
2012 software